Jordan Sebban (born 6 January 1997) is a French footballer who plays as a midfielder.

Career
Sebban started his career with the reserves of French Ligue 1 side Toulouse.

In 2018, he signed for El Ejido in the Spanish third division.

In 2019, Sebban signed for the reserves of Spanish La Liga club Granada.

Before the 2021 season, he signed for KuPS in Finland.

On 16 August 2022 signed for the Israeli Premier League club F.C. Ashdod and received Israeli citizenship thanks to the Law of Return.

References

External links
 
 

1997 births
Living people
21st-century French Jews
Footballers from Toulouse
French footballers
Israeli footballers
Jewish French sportspeople
Jewish footballers
Association football midfielders
Segunda División B players
CD El Ejido players
Club Recreativo Granada players
F.C. Ashdod players
Veikkausliiga players
Kuopion Palloseura players
Israeli Premier League players
French emigrants to Israel
French expatriate footballers
Expatriate footballers in Spain
Expatriate footballers in Finland
French expatriate sportspeople in Spain
French expatriate sportspeople in Finland